Modest Morariu (August 11, 1929 – April 15, 1988) was a poet, essayist, prose writer and translator from Romania.

Morariu was born in Cernăuți. He was a director of the Meridiane publishing house, and translated, amongst others, works by André Malraux, Emil Cioran and Albert Camus into Romanian.

Books

Poems
Povestire cu fantome, 1968
Spectacolul de pantomimă, 1971
Ovăzul sălbatic, 1974

Novel
Întoarcerea lui Ulise, 1982

Essays
Între relativ şi absolut, 1979
Itinerarii, 1987

Fine arts albums
Ion Gheorghiu, 1966
Florin Pucă, 1974
Rousseau le Douanier, 1975
Goya-capricii, 1974
Toulouse-Lautrec, 1980

References

Aurel Sasu, Dicționarul biografic al literaturii române (M-Z), Paralela 45, 2006
Dana Dumitriu, in România literară, nr. 44, 1974
Valeriu Cristea, in România literară, nr. 6, 1976
Mircea Iorgulescu, România literară, nr. 42, 1979
Mircea Ivănescu, in Transilvania, nr. 9, 1982
Mihai Ungheanu, in Luceafărul, nr. 39, 1982

1929 births
1988 deaths
Romanian male poets
Writers from Chernivtsi
20th-century Romanian poets
20th-century Romanian male writers